The Raguba field is an oil field located in the central part of Libya's Sirte Basin in Concession 20. The Sirte Oil Company (SOC) operates the Raguba field. The field is connected by pipeline to the main line between the Nasser field, one of the largest in Libya, and Brega. Raguba field has 80 wells producing high gravity (43 °API) oil. The first exploration oil well in this field was drilled in January 1961 with production commencing in 1963.

Sirte Basin
Libya's onshore oil has been discovered mainly in three geological trends of the Sirte Basin: 1) the western fairway, which includes several large oil fields (Samah, Beida, Raguba, Dahra-Hofra, and Bahi); 2) the north-center of the country, which contains the giant Defa-Waha field and Nasser fields, as well as the large Hateiba gas field; and 3) an easterly trend, which has large fields like Sarir, Messla, Gialo, Bu Attifel, Intisar, Nafoora-Augila, and Amal. Overall, the Sirte Basin contains approximately 80% of Libya's proven oil reserves and accounts for 90% of production.

Notes

See also 

 List of oil fields

References
Baird, D.W., Geohistory and petroleum in the central Sirt Basin, in The geology of Sirt Basin: p. 3-56.

External links
Eni Website

Oil fields of Libya
Tripolitania